Wilkins House may refer to:

 Wilkins House, historical building in Los Angeles, California
 Wilkins House, listed on the National Register of Historic Places (NRHP) in Clarke County, Georgia
 Wilkins House, in Greenville, South Carolina
 Wilkins House, listed on the NRHP in Harris County, Texas
 Townsend-Wilkins House, Victoria, Texas, listed on the NRHP in Victoria County, Texas
Gordon Wilkins House, house designed by architect Richard Neutra in 1949
Emily J. Wilkins House, Embassy of Peru in Washington, D.C.